Henrik Heintz Hungarian, (1896, Budapest - 1955, Szakcs) was a Hungarian painter.

References 
 
 

Artists from Budapest
1896 births
1955 deaths
20th-century Hungarian painters
Hungarian male painters
20th-century Hungarian male artists